The coat of arms of Colombia contains a shield with numerous symbols. Perched on top of the shield is an Andean condor holding an olive crown and the condor symbolizing freedom. The national motto, Libertad y Orden (Spanish for Liberty and Order), is on a scroll in between the bird and the shield in black font over golden background. The condor is depicted as displayed (with his wings extended) and looking to the right.

Description
The national flag is draped on each side of the shield. The shield is broken into three portions. In the lowermost portion is a depiction of ships, pointing to the maritime history of Colombia, mainly to the Isthmus of Panama, which was part of Colombia until 1903. Nowadays represents the two oceans that border the country (Atlantic and Pacific). The sails mean the Colombian commerce with the rest of the world and the rising economy. In the middle section, over a field of silver (argent), the Phrygian cap is presented; this being a traditional symbol of liberty and freedom. The topmost section contains a pomegranate over a blue (azure) field, as a symbol of the Vice royalty of New Granada (early colonial name of Colombia back in the 18th century), in the middle flanked by two cornucopias or horns of plenty: the one at the right with golden and silver coins and the one at the left with tropical fruits. This portion represents the agricultural and mineral wealth of Colombian soil.

The coat of arms of the Republic was designed by Francisco de Paula Santander, and was adopted via Act 3 of 9 May 1834, with later non-essential modifications according to Ordinance 861 of 1924.

Gallery
National coat of arms

Historical coats of arms

Other versions

See also
 Flag of Colombia
 ¡Oh, Gloria Inmarcesible!

Bibliography

External links

 Law 12 of 1984 by which the national symbols of the Republic of Colombia are adopted. National Television Commission.
 National Symbols of Colombia. National Emblem - Coat of Arms.
 National Symbols. Agustín Codazzi Geographic Institute.
 National Symbols of Colombia. Luis Ángel Arango Library.
 National symbols of Colombia. Consulate General of Colombia.

Colombia
 
National symbols of Colombia
Colombia
Colombia
Colombia
Colombia
Colombia
Colombia
Colombia
Colombia
Colombia
Colombia